The tenth season of Food Paradise, an American food reality television series narrated by Jess Blaze Snider (formally Mason Pettit) on the Travel Channel, premiered on January 22, 2017. First-run episodes of the series aired in the United States on the Travel Channel on Mondays at 10:00 p.m. EDT. The season contained 13 episodes and concluded airing on May 14, 2017.

Food Paradise features the best places to find various cuisines at food locations across America. Each episode focuses on a certain type of restaurant, such as "Diners", "Bars", "Drive-Thrus" or "Breakfast" places that people go to find a certain food specialty.

Episodes 
Note: These episodes aired from January 22 - May 14, 2017.

Vegas Baby!

Here's the Beef

Feasting at the Fair

Food with a View

Passport on a Plate

Stuffed

Taste of the Town

Trejo's Cantina is owned by Danny Trejo

All-American Classics

Sausage Kings

Pub Grub

Stack Attack

Like Mama Made

Better With Bacon

References

External links
Food Paradise @Travelchannel.com

2017 American television seasons